Graecoanatolica anatolica is a species of freshwater snail, an aquatic gastropod mollusk in the family Hydrobiidae. The species is endemic to the Düden Waterfalls of Turkey.

References

Hydrobiidae
Graecoanatolica
Gastropods described in 1965